Fiddown is a small village in Kilkenny, Ireland. It is located in the south of the county just off the N24 road,  58 kilometres from Kilkenny city. The village is on the banks of the River Suir, near the border with County Waterford to which the village is connected via the Fiddown Bridge.

Fiddown was the site of a 6th century monastery, associated with the monk Maidoc or Momodoc, which was located near the river crossing.

See also
List of towns and villages in Ireland

References

Towns and villages in County Kilkenny